List of gates in India

Assam
Northbrook Gate

Bihar
Sabhyata Dwar

Delhi
Ajmeri Gate
Alai Darwaza
Bahadur Shahi Gate
Delhi Gate
Delhi Gate (Red Fort)
 Entrance to Humayun's Tomb
 Entrance to Jama Masjid
 Entrance of the Mausoleum of Ghiyath al-Din Tughluq at Tughlaqabad Fort
Gateway into Arab Sarai, near Humayun's Tomb Complex
India Gate
 Jamali Kamali Entrance, Mehrauli
Kabuli Gate
Kashmiri Gate
Khooni Darwaza
Lahori Gate (Red Fort)
Lal Darwaza
 Main Gate to Tomb of Safdarjung
Nigambodh Gate
Tripolia Gates
Turkman Gate
 Water Gate of Red Fort
Zafar Gate of Zafar Mahal, Mehrauli

Goa
Gate of Rachol Fortress
Gate of Saint Paul's College

Gujarat
 Akshardwar, Shri Swaminarayan Mandir, Bhavnagar
 Gates of Ahmedabad
 Sayajirao Palace Gate, Vadodara
 Vadodari Gate, Dabhoi
 Tan Darvajaa (Three Gates), Dhoraji
 Teen Darwaza, Bhadra Fort, Ahmedabad
 Ray Gate, Junagadh
 Majhevdi Gate, Junagadh.

Karnataka
Bidar Fort Gate, Bidar
Daria Daulat Bagh Gate, Srirangapatna
Vittala Temple Gate, Hampi

Madhya Pradesh
Alamgir Darwaza, Mandu
Badalgarh Gate at Gwalior Fort
Bhopal Gate, Bhopal
Entrance Gate of Taj-ul-Masajid, Bhopal
Entrance to Moti Masjid, Bhopal
Gadi Darwaza, Mandu
Gate of Teli Mandir Gwalior
Hathi Pol at Gwalior Fort
Sanchi Gateways (Toranas), Sanchi 
Ratlami Gate, Jaora

Maharashtra

Bhadkal Gate, Aurangabad
Delhi Gate, Aurangabad
 Entrance to Bibi Ka Maqbara, Aurangabad 
Gateway of aurangabad, aurangabad
Kaala Gate, Aurangabad
Mahmood Gate, Aurangabad
Makai Gate, Aurangabad
Mecca Gate, Aurangabad
Paithan Gate, Aurangabad
Rangeen Gate, Aurangabad 
Roshan Gate, Aurangabad
Katkat Gate, Aurangabad
Barapulla Gate, Aurangabad
Naubat Gate, Aurangabad
Khaas Gate, Aurangabad
Jaffar Gate,  Aurangabad
Begum Gate, Aurangabad
Chota Bhadkal Gate, Aurangabad
Hathi Gate,  Aurangabad
Khooni Gate,  Aurangabad
Mir Adil Gate, Aurangabad
Buland Gate,  Aurangabad

Punjab
Nurmahal Sarai Mughal Gateway

Rajasthan
Chandpole, Chanpori Gate, Surajpole, Ajmeri gate, New gate, Sanganeri gate, Ghat gate, Samrat gate, Zorawar Singh Gate at Jaipur
Ganesh Pol, Suraj Pol, Tripolia gate, Lion gate at Amer Fort, Jaipur
Hanuman Pol at Kumbhalgarh, Rajsamand District
Jayapol, Fattehpol, Dedh Kamgra Pol and Loha Pol at Mehrangarh Fort in Jodhpur
Karan Pol, Suraj Pol, Daulat Pol, Chand Pol and Fateh Pol at Junagarh Fort, Bikaner
Ram Pol, Padan Pol, Bhairon Pol, Hanuman Pol, Ganesh Pol, Jodla Pol, Laxman Pol at Chittor Fort

Telangana
Chowmahalla Palace gate tower, Hyderabad
Kakatiya Kala Thoranam or Warangal Gate

Uttar Pradesh
Babe Syed Gate, Aligarh Muslim University, Aligarh
Amar Singh Gate, Agra
Buland Darwaza, Fatehpur Sikri
 Entrance Gate to Jama Masjid, Agra
 Entrance Gate to Tomb of Akbar the Great, Agra
 Entrance Gate to Tomb of I'timād-ud-Daulah, Agra
 Entrance to Bahu Begum ka Maqbara, Faizabad
Gateway to Bara Imambara, Lucknow
Gateway to Gulab Bari, Faizabad
 Great gate (Darwaza-i rauza) Taj Mahal, Agra
Laal Darwaza, Ramnagar Fort, Varanasi
Rumi Darwaza, Lucknow
Shahji Temple Gate, Vrindavan

Gallery

See also
 Fort and Gates of Ahmedabad
 Gates in Aurangabad, Maharashtra
 Gates of Delhi